Curt Valentin (5 October 1902, Hamburg, Germany – 19 August 1954, Forte dei Marmi, Italy) was a German-Jewish art dealer known for handling modern art, particularly sculpture, and works classified as "degenerate" and stolen from European museums by the Nazi regime in Germany.

After 1927 Curt Valentin worked for Alfred Flechtheim in Berlin. In 1934, he worked at Karl Buchholz Gallery, Hamburg. In 1937, he emigrated to America, and opened a modern art gallery, Bucholz gallery, in New York City. He had permission to sell German art in America, from the Nazi authorities to help fund Hitler's war efforts.

On June 30, 1939, Curt Valentin bid for art looted by the Nazis that was being auctioned at the Fischer Gallery in Lucerne on behalf of Alfred Barr who provided money donated to the Museum of Modern Art. In 1951 the gallery was renamed the Curt Valentin Gallery. His gallery operated from 1951, until a year after his death in 1954, and handled works by many notable artists including Alexander Calder, Henry Moore, Marino Marini, Irving Kriesberg, and Jacques Lipchitz.

References

External links
"Curt Valentin in his gallery, ca. 1952", Photography by Adolph Studly, at Archives of American Art
Ludwig Meidner: "Curt Valentin", MOMA
Marino Marini and Curt Valentin: The Rise of the Italian Sculptor in America.
"Artnews : MOMA's problematic provenances"
"Bridges from the Reich: The Importance of Émigré Art Dealers as Reflected in the Case Studies of Curt Valentin and Otto Kallir– Nirenstein"

American art dealers
1902 births
1954 deaths
Emigrants from Nazi Germany to the United States
German art dealers